Bridgeport Academy is an alternative school in Hampton, Virginia. Established in 2007, the school serves middle and high school students as an alternative education from regular Hampton City Public Schools.

History
The school opened in August 2007 and was originally housed in a strip mall on North Armistead St. in downtown Hampton, using space that was under lease from Queen Street Baptist Church. In February 2008, Bridgeport moved to its current location at 3217 Commander Shepard Boulevard.

References

External links
Bridgeport Academy

Schools in Hampton, Virginia
Public high schools in Virginia
Public middle schools in Virginia
Alternative schools in the United States